Thomas Jefferson's involvement with and support of education is best known through his founding of the University of Virginia, which he established in 1819 as a secular institution after he left the presidency of the United States.  Jefferson believed that libraries and books were so integral to individual and institutional education that he designed the university around its library.

In 1779, in "A Bill for the More General Diffusion of Knowledge," Jefferson proposed a system of public education to be tax-funded for 3 years for "all the free children, male and female," which was an unusual perspective for the time period. They were allowed to attend longer if their parents, friends, or family could pay for it independently.

In his book Notes on the State of Virginia (1785), Jefferson had scribed his ideas for public education at the elementary level.  In 1817 he proposed a plan for a system of limited state public education for males only, in keeping with the times.  It depended on public grammar schools, and further education of a limited number of the best students, and those whose parents wanted to pay for them. The university was to be the capstone, available to only the best selected students.  Virginia did not establish free public education in the primary grades until after the American Civil War under the Reconstruction era legislature.

Jefferson's education

In 1752, Jefferson began attending a local school run by a Scottish Presbyterian minister. At the age of nine, Jefferson began studying Latin, Greek, and French; he learned to ride horses, and began to appreciate the study of nature. He studied under the Reverend James Maury from 1758 to 1760 near Gordonsville, Virginia. While boarding with Maury's family, he studied history, science and the classics.

In 1760, Jefferson entered The College of William & Mary in Williamsburg at the age of 16; he studied there for two years. At William & Mary, he enrolled in the philosophy school and studied mathematics, metaphysics, and philosophy under Professor William Small, who introduced Jefferson to the writings of the British Empiricists, including John Locke, Francis Bacon, and Isaac Newton. He also perfected his French, carried his Greek grammar book wherever he went, practiced the violin, and read Tacitus and Homer. Jefferson displayed an avid curiosity in all fields and, according to the family tradition, frequently studied fifteen hours a day. 
His closest college friend, John Page of Rosewell, reported that Jefferson "could tear himself away from his dearest friends to fly to his studies."

While in college, Jefferson was a member of a secret organization called the Flat Hat Club, now the namesake of the William & Mary student newspaper. He lodged and boarded at the College in the building known today as the Sir Christopher Wren Building, attending communal meals in the Great Hall, and morning and evening prayers in the Wren Chapel. Jefferson often attended the lavish parties of royal governor Francis Fauquier, where he played his violin and developed an early love for wines. After graduation, he studied law with George Wythe and was admitted to the Virginia bar in 1767.

Libraries
Throughout his life, Jefferson depended on books for his education. He collected and accumulated thousands of books for his library at Monticello. A significant portion of Jefferson's library was also bequeathed to him in the will of George Wythe, who had an extensive collection. Always eager for more knowledge, Jefferson continued learning throughout most of his life. Jefferson once said, "I cannot live without books."

By 1815, Jefferson's library included 6,487 books, which he sold to the Library of Congress for $23,950 to replace the smaller collection destroyed in the War of 1812. He intended to pay off some of his large debt, but immediately started buying more books.<ref name="Liggio">Leonard Liggio, "The Life and Works of Thomas Jefferson" , The Locke Luminary Vol. II, No. 1 (Summer 1999) Part 3, George Mason University, accessed 10 January 2012</ref>  In honor of Jefferson's contribution, the library's website for federal legislative information was named THOMAS. In 2007, Jefferson's two-volume 1764 edition of the Qur'an was used by Rep. Keith Ellison for his swearing into the House of Representatives.
In February 2011 the New York Times reported that a part of Jefferson's retirement library, containing 74 volumes with 28 book titles, was discovered at Washington University in St. Louis.

Virginia legislature

Notes on the State of Virginia

In 1780 Jefferson as governor received numerous questions about Virginia, posed to him by François Barbé-Marbois, then Secretary of the French delegation in Philadelphia, the temporary capital of the united colonies, who intended to gather pertinent data on the American colonies. Jefferson's responses to Marbois' "Queries" would become known as Notes on the State of Virginia (1785). Scientifically trained, Jefferson was a member of the American Philosophical Society, which had been founded in Philadelphia in 1743. He had extensive knowledge of western lands from Virginia to Illinois. In a course of 5 years, Jefferson enthusiastically devoted his intellectual energy to the book; he included a discussion of contemporary scientific knowledge, and Virginia's history, politics, and ethnography. Jefferson was aided by Thomas Walker, George R. Clark, and U.S. geographer Thomas Hutchins. The book was first published in France in 1785 and in England in 1787.
	
It has been ranked as the most important American book published before 1800. The book is Jefferson's vigorous and often eloquent argument about the nature of the good society, which he believed was incarnated by Virginia. In it he expressed his beliefs in the separation of church and state, constitutional government, checks and balances, and individual liberty. He also compiled extensive data about the state's natural resources and economy.

Presidency

Military academy at West Point

Ideas for a national institution for military education were circulated during the American Revolution. It wasn't until 1802 when Jefferson, following the advice of George Washington, John Adams and others, finally convinced Congress to authorize the funding and building of the United States Military Academy at West Point on the Hudson River in New York. On March 16, 1802, Jefferson signed the Military Peace Establishment Act, directing that a corps of engineers be established and "stationed at West Point in the state of New York, and shall constitute a Military Academy." The Act would provide well-trained officers for a professional army. The officers would be reliable republicans rather than a closed elite as in Europe, for the cadets were to be appointed by Congressmen, and thus exactly reflect the nation's politics. In May 1801 Secretary of War Henry Dearborn announced that the president had "decided in favor of the immediate establishment of a military school at West Point and also on the appointment of Major Jonathan Williams", grandnephew of Benjamin Franklin, to direct "the necessary arrangements, at that place for the commencement of the school." On July 4, 1802, the US Military Academy at West Point formally commenced its role as an institution for scientific and military learning.

Later years

Plan for systematic education
In 1785, Jefferson proposed a system of public schools for the Commonwealth of Virginia in the interest of "diffus[ing] knowledge more generally through the mass of the people". According to Jefferson, "The ultimate result of the whole scheme of education would be the teaching all the children of the state reading, writing, and common arithmetic: turning out [several] annually of superior genius, well taught in Greek, Latin, geography, and the higher branches of arithmetic: turning out...others annually, of still superior parts, who, to those branches of learning, shall have added such of the sciences as their genius shall have led them to." As a byproduct, this plan would furnish "to the wealthier part of the people convenient schools, at which their children may be educated, at their own expense."

The plan was for education of children in three successive stages corresponding with three types of schools: primary schools, which all children, regardless of their parents' financial ability, would be able to attend for at least three years; intermediate schools, for students who excelled in primary school, as well as for children whose parents are willing and able to pay for it; and the university, for students whose parents were willing to pay.Thomas Jefferson to A. Coray, 1823. ME 15:487

Stage I: primary school (ages 6–8)
Jefferson proposed creating several five- to six-square-mile-sized school districts, called "wards" or "hundreds", throughout Virginia, where "the great mass of the people will receive their instruction". Each district would have a primary school and a tutor who is supported by a tax on the people of the district. Every family in the district would be entitled to send their children to the school for three years, free of charge.Thomas Jefferson to M. Correa de Serra, 1817. ME 15:156 A family could continue sending a child after three years, but the family would have to pay for it.

These schools would teach "reading, writing, and arithmetic"; the "general notions of geography"; as well as Greek, Roman, European and American history. It was important that all children learn history because "apprising them of the past will enable them to judge of the future." According to Jefferson, "the principal foundations of future order will be laid here" and "the first elements of morality too may be instilled into [the children's] minds".

Jefferson opposed providing children in these schools religious texts, since he believed the children would be "at an age when their judgments are not sufficiently matured for religious enquiries". However, he was in favor of showing the children that happiness "does not depend on the condition of life in which chance has placed them, but is always the result of a good conscience, good health, occupation, and freedom in all just pursuits."

Stage II: intermediate school (ages 9–16)
Each year, an official would visit the Fayoy school and choose one boy — a boy whose parents were too poor to provide their child further education — to continue on for at least one or two (and possibly up to eight) years at one of the Commonwealth's twenty grammar schools. Other parents willing and able to pay for it could send their children as well.

In the grammar schools, children would learn Greek and Latin; advanced geography; the higher branches of numerical arithmetic; geometry; and the elementary principles of navigation.

Jefferson believed that a child's memory is the most active between the ages of 8 and 16 years. As he thought that learning languages mostly involved memorizing, he thought this period was the ideal time to learn "the most useful languages antient and modern." Linguists have found that people learn additional languages more readily if starting at a younger age. Jefferson thought this age group was also best able to acquire mental "tools for future operation", including "useful facts and good principles". He warned that "if this period be suffered to pass in idleness, the mind [would become] lethargic and impotent, as would the body it inhabits if unexercised during the same time."

After about two years, the "best genius" from each grammar school would be selected to continue another six years studying these subjects, while the rest would be dismissed. According to Jefferson, "By this means twenty of the best geniuses will be raked from the rubbish annually, and be instructed, at the public expence, so far as the grammar schools go." 

Stage III: university (ages 17–19)
At the end of grammar school, one half of the boys would be dismissed. This half would include future grammar school masters. The other half, "chosen for the superiority of their parts and disposition," would continue studying three more years at the university, "in the study of such sciences as they shall chuse". Jefferson considered the university to be the capstone of the educational system. To accommodate the influx of students, Jefferson proposed that the College of William and Mary be enlarged "and extended to all the useful sciences".

Father of a universitySeen also: History of the University of Virginia''

After leaving the presidency, Jefferson continued to be active in public affairs. He also became increasingly concerned with founding a new institution of higher learning, specifically one free of church influences, where students could specialize in many new areas not offered at other universities. Jefferson believed educating people was a good way to establish an organized society, and also felt schools should be paid for by the general public, so less wealthy people could obtain student membership as well. A letter to Joseph Priestley, in January, 1800, indicated that he had been planning the University for decades before its establishment.

His dream was realized in 1819 with the founding of the University of Virginia. Upon its opening in 1825, it was then the first university to offer a full slate of elective courses to its students. Closely involved in the university until his death, Jefferson invited students and faculty of the school to his home; Edgar Allan Poe was among those students. 

One of the largest construction projects to that time in North America, the university was notable for being centered about a library rather than a church. Jefferson did not include a campus chapel in his original plans.

Jefferson is widely recognized for his architectural planning of the University of Virginia and its grounds.  His innovative design was a powerful representation of his aspirations for both state sponsored education and an agrarian democracy in the new Republic. His educational idea of creating specialized units of learning is physically expressed in the configuration of his campus plan, which he called the "Academical Village." Individual academic units are designed as distinct structures, represented by Pavilions, facing a grassy quadrangle, with each Pavilion housing classroom, faculty office, and residences. Though unique, each is visually equal in importance, and they are linked together with a series of open-air arcades that are the front facades of student accommodations. Gardens and vegetable plots are placed behind surrounded by serpentine walls, affirming the importance of the agrarian lifestyle.

Jefferson's highly ordered site plan establishes an ensemble of buildings surrounding a central rectangular quadrangle, named The Lawn, which is lined on either side with the academic teaching units and their linking arcades. The quad is enclosed at one end with the library, the repository of knowledge, at the head of the table. The remaining side opposite the library remained open-ended for future growth. The lawn rises gradually as a series of stepped terraces, each a few feet higher than the last, rising up to the library, which was set in the most prominent position at the top.

Jefferson was a proponent of the Greek and Roman architectural styles, which he believed to be most representative of American democracy by historical association. These were popular during the federal period across the United States. Each academic unit is designed with a two-story temple front facing the quadrangle, while the library is modeled on the Roman Pantheon. The ensemble of buildings surrounding the quad is a statement of the importance of secular public education, while the exclusion of religious structures reinforces the principal of separation of church and state. The campus planning and architectural treatment is considered a paradigm of the ordering of man-made structures to express intellectual ideas and aspirations. A survey of members of the American Institute of Architects identified Jefferson's campus as the most significant work of architecture in America.

The University was designed as the capstone of the educational system of Virginia. In Jefferson's vision, any young white male citizen of the commonwealth could attend the school if he had the required ability and achievement as an earlier student.

Jefferson's views on education of citizens
Jefferson was an advocate of public education. In a 1786 letter to George Wythe, he remarked that "the most important bill in our whole code, is that for the diffusion of knowledge among the people." He believed that "no other sure foundation can be devised for the preservation of freedom and                                happiness" and that failing to provide public education would "leave the people in ignorance." But,  Jefferson did not believe in forcing parents to place their children in school, positing that "it is better to tolerate the rare instance of a parent refusing to let his child be educated, than to shock the common feelings and ideas by the forcible asportation [removal] and education of the infant against the will of the father."

Views on classical learning
"For classical learning I have ever been a zealous advocate."—Thomas Jefferson to Thomas Cooper, 1814. ME 14:200

"When we advert that the ancient classical languages are considered as the foundation preparatory for all the sciences; that we have always had schools scattered over the country for teaching these languages, which often were the ultimate term of education; that these languages are entered on at the age of nine or ten years, at which age parents would be unwilling to send their children from every part of the State to a central and distant university, and when we observe that... there are to be a plurality of them, we may well conclude that the Greek and Latin are the objects of these colleges... and that they are intended as the portico of entry to the university."—Thomas Jefferson to Wilson C. Nicholas, 1816. ME 14:452

"To whom are these [classical languages] useful? Certainly not to all men. There are conditions of life to which they must be forever estranged, and there are epochs of life, too, after which the endeavor to attain them would be a great misemployment of time. Their acquisition should be the occupation of our early years only, when the memory is susceptible of deep and lasting impressions, and reason and judgment not yet strong enough for abstract speculations."—Thomas Jefferson to John Brazier, 1819. ME 15:209

"[The Latin and Greek] languages... constitute the basis of good education, and are indispensable to fill up the character of a 'well-educated man.'"—Thomas Jefferson: Virginia Board of Visitors Minutes, 1824. ME 19:444

"[As to] the extent to which classical learning should be carried in our country... The utilities we derive from the remains of the Greek and Latin languages are, first, as models of pure taste in writing. To these we are certainly indebted for the rational and chaste style of modern composition which so much distinguishes the nations to whom these languages are familiar... Second. Among the values of classical learning, I estimate the luxury of reading the Greek and Roman authors in all the beauties of their originals. And why should not this innocent and elegant luxury take its preeminent stand ahead of all those addressed merely to the sense?... Third. A third value is in the stores of real science deposited and transmitted us in these languages, to wit: in history, ethics, arithmetic, geometry, astronomy, natural history, etc."—Thomas Jefferson to John Brazier, 1819. ME 15:208

"[Greece was] the first of civilized nations [which] presented example of what man should be."—Thomas Jefferson to A. Coray, 1823. ME 15:481

"I think the Greeks and Romans have left us the present models which exist of fine composition, whether we examine them as works of reason, or of style and fancy; and to them we probably owe these characteristics of modern composition. I know of no composition of any other ancient people which merits the least regard as a model for its matter or style. To all this I add, that to read the Latin and Greek authors in their original is a sublime luxury; and I deem luxury in science to be at least as justifiable as in architecture, painting, gardening, or the other arts."—Thomas Jefferson to Joseph Priestley, 1800. ME 10:146

"It may be truly said that the classical languages are a solid basis for most, and an ornament to all the sciences."—Thomas Jefferson to John Brazier, 1819. ME 15:211

"I make it a rule never to read translations where I can read the original."—Thomas Jefferson to Edmund Randolph, 1794. ME 9:280

"Indeed, no translation can be [an adequate representation of the excellences of the original]."—Thomas Jefferson to A. L. C. Destutt de Tracy, 1811. ME 13:14

"I have not, however, carried so far as [some] do my ideas of the importance of a hypercritical knowledge of the Latin and Greek languages. I have believed it sufficient to possess a substantial understanding of their authors."—Thomas Jefferson to Thomas Cooper, 1814. ME 14:200

Views on textbooks
Jefferson was not opposed to textbooks, and believed that in most cases an individual professor, not school trustees, should be the one to choose which particular texts should be used in that professor's course. One exception would be a case in which a professor desired to teach using a text that advocated federalism. In such a case, Jefferson believed the trustees would be justified in overruling the professor in order "to guard against such principles being disseminated among our youth."

Views on professors
Jefferson was in favor of students learning from professors, and believed that professors should have "the talent of communicating...knowledge with facility". In addition, Jefferson believed that professors should have a knowledge not just of their own profession, but "should be otherwise well-educated as to the sciences generally; able to converse understandingly with the scientific men with whom he is associated, and to assist in the councils of the faculty on any subject of science on which they may have occasion to deliberate." A professor not so educated would "incur...contempt, and bring disreputation on the institution." Jefferson was also in favor of selecting professors based on their political leanings.

Views on structuring content
"I hope the necessity will, at length, be seen of establishing institutions here, as in Europe, where every branch of science, useful at this day, may be taught in its highest degree."—Thomas Jefferson to John Adams, 1814. ME 14:151

"What are the objects of an useful American [college] education? Classical knowledge, modern languages and chiefly French, Spanish, and Italian; Mathematics, Natural philosophy, Natural history, Civil history, and Ethics. In Natural philosophy, I mean to include Chemistry and Agriculture, and in Natural history, to include Botany, as well as the other branches of those departments."—Thomas Jefferson to J. Bannister, Jr., 1785. ME 5:186, Papers 8:636

"It would be time lost... to attend professors of ethics, metaphysics, logic, etc. The first of these may be as well acquired in the closet as from living lecturers; and supposing the two last to mean the science of mind, the simple reading of Locke, Tracy, and Stewart will give him as much in that branch as is real science."—Thomas Jefferson to Thomas Cooper, 1820. ME 15:265

"Agriculture... is a science of the very first order. It counts among its handmaids the most respectable sciences, such as Chemistry, Natural Philosophy, Mechanics, Mathematics generally, Natural History, Botany. In every College and University, a professorship of agriculture, and the class of its students, might be honored as the first."—Thomas Jefferson to David Williams, 1803. ME 10:429

"In my view, no knowledge can be more satisfactory to a man than that of his own frame, its parts, their functions and actions. And Botany I rank with the most valuable sciences, whether we consider its subjects as furnishing the principal subsistence of life to man and beast, delicious varieties for our tables, refreshments from our orchards, the adornments of our flower-borders, shade and perfume of our groves, materials for our buildings, or medicaments for our bodies. To the gentleman it is certainly more interesting than Mineralogy (which I by no means, however, undervalue), and is more at hand for his amusement; and to a country family it constitutes a great portion of their social entertainment. No country gentleman should be without what amuses every step he takes into his fields."—Thomas Jefferson to Thomas Cooper, 1814. ME 14:201

"In the [elementary schools] will be taught reading, writing, common arithmetic, and general notions of geography. In the [district colleges], ancient and modern languages, geography fully, a higher degree of numerical arithmetic, mensuration, and the elementary principles of navigation. In the [university], all the useful sciences in their highest degree."—Thomas Jefferson to M. Correa de Serra, 1817. ME 15:155

"I am not fully informed of the practices at Harvard, but there is one from which we shall certainly vary, although it has been copied, I believe, by nearly every college and academy in the United States. That is, the holding the students all to one prescribed course of reading, and disallowing exclusive application to those branches only which are to qualify them for the particular vocations to which they are destined. We shall, on the contrary, allow them uncontrolled choice in the lectures they shall choose to attend, and require elementary qualification only, and sufficient age."—Thomas Jefferson to George Ticknor, 1823. ME 15:455

"This institution [i.e., the university] will be based on the illimitable freedom of the human mind. For here we are not afraid to follow truth wherever it may lead, nor to tolerate any error so long as reason is left free to combat it."—Thomas Jefferson to William Roscoe, 1820. ME 15:303

"We do not expect our schools to turn out their alumni already enthroned on the pinnacles of their respective sciences; but only so far advanced in each as to be able to pursue them by themselves, and to become Newtons and Laplaces by energies and perseverances to be continued through life."—Thomas Jefferson to John P. Emmet, 1826. ME 16:171

"In most public seminaries textbooks are prescribed to each of the several schools, as the norma docendi in that school; and this is generally done by authority of the trustees. I should not propose this generally in our University, because I believe none of us are so much at the heights of science in the several branches as to undertake this, and therefore that it will be better left to the professors until occasion of interference shall be given. But there is one branch in which we are the best judges, in which heresies may be taught of so interesting a character to our own State and to the United States, as to make it a duty in us to lay down the principles which are to be taught. It is that of government... [A new professor may be] one of that school of quondam federalism, now consolidation. It is our duty to guard against such principles being disseminated among our youth and the diffusion of that poison, by a previous prescription of the texts to be followed in their discourses."—Thomas Jefferson to -----, 1825. ME 16:103

"The objects of... primary education [which] determine its character and limits [are]: To give to every citizen the information he needs for the transaction of his own business; to enable him to calculate for himself, and to express and preserve his ideas, his contracts and accounts in writing; to improve, by reading, his morals and faculties; to understand his duties to his neighbors and country, and to discharge with competence the functions confided to him by either; to know his rights; to exercise with order and justice those he retains, to choose with discretion the fiduciary of those he delegates; and to notice their conduct with diligence, with candor and judgment; and in general, to observe with intelligence and faithfulness all the social relations under which he shall be placed."—Thomas Jefferson: Report for University of Virginia, 1818.

"The reading in the first stage, where [the people] will receive their whole education, is proposed.. to be chiefly historical. History by apprising them of the past will enable them to judge of the future; it will avail them of the experience of other times and other nations; it will qualify them as judges of the actions and designs of men; it will enable them to know ambition under every disguise it may assume; and knowing it, to defeat its views."—Thomas Jefferson: Notes on Virginia Q.XIV, 1782. ME 2:106

"Such a degree of learning [should be] given to every member of the society as will enable him to read, to judge and to vote understandingly on what is passing."—Thomas Jefferson to Littleton Waller Tazewell, 1805.

"A great obstacle to good education is the inordinate passion prevalent for novels, and the time lost in that reading which should be instructively employed. When this poison infects the mind, it destroys its tone and revolts it against wholesome reading. Reason and fact, plain and unadorned, are rejected. Nothing can engage attention unless dressed in all the figments of fancy, and nothing so bedecked comes amiss. The result is a bloated imagination, sickly judgment, and disgust towards all the real businesses of life. This mass of trash, however, is not without some distinction; some few modeling their narratives, although fictitious, on the incidents of real life, have been able to make them interesting and useful vehicles of a sound morality... For a like reason, too, much poetry should not be indulged. Some is useful for forming style and taste. Pope, Dryden, Thompson, Shakespeare, and of the French, Moliere, Racine, the Corneilles, may be read with pleasure and improvement."—Thomas Jefferson to Nathaniel Burwell, 1818. ME 15:166

"Promote in every order of men the degree of instruction proportioned to their condition and to their views in life."—Thomas Jefferson to Joseph Cabell, 1820. ME 15:292

"Every folly must run its round; and so, I suppose, must that of self-learning and self-sufficiency: of rejecting the knowledge acquired in past ages, and starting on the new ground of intuition. When sobered by experience, I hope our successors will turn their attention to the advantages of education. I mean of education on the broad scale."—Thomas Jefferson to John Adams, 1814. ME 14:150

Thomas Jefferson was a pragmatic with regards to education. He emphasized the practical benefit. However, his emphasis on the practical did not restrict learning to purely career-focused pursuits; he believed that reading classic literature made a practical contribution to education, since it enhanced critical thinking and awareness of the world in general.

Views on educational quality

Views on educational conformity
"Man is an imitative animal. This quality is the germ of all education in him. From his cradle to his grave he is learning to do what he sees others do."—Thomas Jefferson: Notes on Virginia Q.XVIII, 1782. ME 2:226

"The article of discipline is the most difficult in American education. Premature ideas of independence, too little repressed by parents, beget a spirit of insubordination which is the great obstacle to science with us and a principal cause of its decay since the Revolution."—Thomas Jefferson to Thomas Cooper, 1822. ME 15:406

"The rock which I most dread is the discipline of the institution, and it is that on which most of our public schools labor. The insubordination of our youth is now the greatest obstacle to their education. We may lessen the difficulty, perhaps, by avoiding too much government, by requiring no useless observances, none which shall merely multiply occasions for dissatisfaction, disobedience and revolt by referring to the more discreet of themselves the minor discipline, the graver to the civil magistrates."—Thomas Jefferson to George Ticknor, 1823. ME 15:455

"The consequences of foreign education are alarming to me as an American... Cast your eye over America. Who are the men of most learning, of most eloquence, most beloved by their countrymen and most trusted and promoted by them? They are those who have been educated among them, and whose manners, morals and habits are perfectly homogeneous with those of the country."—Thomas Jefferson to John Banister, Jr., 1785. (*) ME 5:188, Papers 8:637

"I do not count on any advantage to be derived... from a familiar acquaintance with the principles of [a] government [which has been] rendered... a tyrannical aristocracy, more likely to give ill than good ideas to an American."—Thomas Jefferson to John Banister, Jr., 1785. (*)

"[One of] the disadvantages of sending a youth to Europe [for an education is]... he is fascinated with the privileges of the European aristocrats, and sees, with abhorrence, the lovely equality which the poor enjoy with the rich in his own country."—Thomas Jefferson to John Banister, Jr., 1785. ME 5:186, Papers 8:636

"Although I do not, with some enthusiasts, believe that the human condition will ever advance to such a state of perfection as that there shall no longer be pain or vice in the world, yet I believe it susceptible of much improvement, and most of all in matters of government and religion; and that the diffusion of knowledge among the people is to be the instrument by which it is to be effected."—Thomas Jefferson to Pierre Samuel Dupont de Nemours, 1816. ME 14:491

"I do hope that in the present spirit of extending to the great mass of mankind the blessings of instruction, I see a prospect of great advancement in the happiness of the human race; and that this may proceed to an indefinite, although not to an infinite degree."—Thomas Jefferson to Cornelius Camden Blatchly, 1822. ME 15:400

"We have spent the prime of our lives in procuring [young men] the precious blessing of liberty. Let them spend theirs in showing that it is the great parent of science and of virtue; and that a nation will be great in both, always in proportion as it is free."—Thomas Jefferson to Joseph Willard, 1789. ME 7:329

"Preach... a crusade against ignorance; establish and improve the law for educating the common people. Let our countrymen know that the people alone can protect us against these evils [of monarchial government]."—Thomas Jefferson to George Wythe, 1786.

Views on simplicity vs. complexity in education

Jefferson wanted education to be simple enough for the common man to understand, but wanted it to be complex so that they could generate wise people out of universities. This process created more and more professors in the country and helped further education in the states.

Views on religion in schools
"The want of instruction in the various creeds of religious faith existing among our citizens presents... a chasm in a general institution of the useful sciences. But it was thought that this want, and the entrustment to each society of instruction in its own doctrine, were evils of less danger than a permission to the public authorities to dictate modes or principles of religious instruction, or than opportunities furnished them by giving countenance or ascendancy to any one sect over another."—Thomas Jefferson: Virginia Board of Visitors Minutes, 1822. ME 19:414

"After stating the constitutional reasons against a public establishment of any religious instruction, we suggest the expediency of encouraging the different religious sects to establish, each for itself, a professorship of their own tenets on the confines of the university, so near as that their students may attend the lectures there and have the free use of our library and every other accommodation we can give them; preserving, however, their independence of us and of each other. This fills the chasm objected to ours, as a defect in an institution professing to give instruction in all useful sciences... And by bringing the sects together, and mixing them with the mass of other students, we shall soften their asperities, liberalize and neutralize their prejudices, and make the general religion a religion of peace, reason, and morality."—Thomas Jefferson to Thomas Cooper, 1822. ME 15:405

References

Bibliography

Jefferson and education
Jefferson and education
Jefferson
Education